Up the Rebels is the second album by Irish folk and rebel band The Wolfe Tones. The title, 'Up the Rebels' is a popular slogan in support of the Irish Republican Army.

Track listing 

The Man From Mullingar
 Three Coloured Ribbon	
 Dying Rebel	
 Finding Of Moses	
 Banna Strand	
 Banks of the Ohio	
 Down By The Liffey Side	
 Valley Of Knockanure	
 Blow Ye Winds	
 Black Ribbon Band	
 The Old Maid	
 Goodbye Mrs. Durkin	
 Song Of The Backwoods

References

External links
 Entry at discogs.com

The Wolfe Tones albums
1966 albums